Abu Nasr Farsi, also known as Abu Nasr-i Parsi, was a Persian statesman, warrior and poet, who served the Ghaznavid sultan Ibrahim (r. 1059–1099) and the latter's son Mas'ud III (r. 1099–1115). There is lack of information about his early life, however, it is known that his family had moved to Lahore and had a long history of service to the Ghaznavids. Abu Nasr spent most of his time in Punjab during the reign of Ibrahim. During the reign of Mas'ud III, he fell out of favor and was deprived of his posts. He died in 1116/1117 during the reign of Arslan-Shah of Ghazna. Abu Nasr was not only a prominent statesman and warrior, but also a great poet. His verses are highly admired by Aufi and Nizami Aruzi.

Sources 
C. E. Bosworth "Abu Nasr Farsi." Encyclopedia Iranica. 24 January 2014. <http://www.iranicaonline.org/articles/abu-nasr-hebatallah-farsi>

11th-century births

1110s deaths
Year of birth unknown
11th-century Iranian people
12th-century Iranian people
Ghaznavid generals
Ghaznavid officials
Ghaznavid-period poets